Tsovazard is a village in the Gavar Municipality of the Gegharkunik Province of Armenia.

History 
There are Bronze Age burial sites and a church rebuilt in the 19th century in the vicinity of the village.

Gallery

References

External links 

 
 
 

Populated places in Gegharkunik Province